Dear God No! is a 2011 US exploitation action-horror film written and directed by James Bickert and starring Jett Bryant.

Cast 
 Jett Bryant as Jett: a ruthless and cool outlaw.
 Madeline Brumby as Edna: a coming of age victim of circumstance.
 Paul McComiskey as Dr Marco: A delusional widower intent on conducting unnatural experimentation.
 Jim Sligh as Sheriff

Development 
Dear God No!, directed by James Bickert, was conceived in the backyard of James's house with Shane Morton and Nick Morgan.  The film was funded on a shoestring by the producers and when they ran out of money a successful Kickstarter campaign was launched which raised $7665 to complete post production.

Release 
Dear God No! was premiered at The Plaza Theater Atlanta in September 2011. The feature was filmed entirely on 16mm film in Atlanta during the fall of 2010.

Artwork 
The theatrical poster for Dear God No! was designed by renowned cult poster artist Tom "The Dude Designs" Hodge.

References

External links 
 
 Trailer on YouTube
 
 Review on Horror Society

2011 films
American independent films
American action horror films
American action thriller films
Films shot in Georgia (U.S. state)
American exploitation films
2010s action horror films
American monster movies
2010s monster movies
Outlaw biker films
Home invasions in film
American science fiction horror films
2010s science fiction horror films
American science fiction action films
2011 science fiction action films
Bigfoot films
Mad scientist films
American splatter films
2010s English-language films
2010s American films